Dastagir Khan (born 4 January 1995) is an Afghan cricketer. He made his first-class debut for Boost Region in the 2017–18 Ahmad Shah Abdali 4-day Tournament on 7 November 2017. He made his List A debut for Boost Region in the 2018 Ghazi Amanullah Khan Regional One Day Tournament on 22 July 2018.

References

External links
 

1995 births
Living people
Afghan cricketers
Boost Defenders cricketers
Place of birth missing (living people)